Live at the Grand Opera House Belfast  is a live album by Northern Irish singer-songwriter Van Morrison, released in 1984.  It was recorded from four live shows in March 1983 at the Grand Opera House, Belfast, Northern Ireland (Morrison's birthplace). The album was composed of songs from Morrison's last four recordings. It is the second live album Morrison released, following 10 years after It's Too Late to Stop Now.

This album was remastered and reissued by Polydor Records on 30 June 2008.  "Rave On John Donne/Rave On Part Two" from this album was listed as one of the standout tracks from the six-album reissue.

At these concerts, the song "Summertime in England" was also recorded and released as the B-side and extra track on the 45 and 12-inch single versions of "Cry for Home."

Track listing
All songs by Van Morrison unless stated otherwise

 "Into the Mystic (Instrumental)/Inarticulate Speech of the Heart" – 1:06
 "Dweller on the Threshold" (Morrison, Murphy) – 3:38
 "It's All in the Game/You Know What They're Writing About/Make It Real One More Time" – 7:09 (Charles Dawes, Carl Sigman)/(Morrison)
 "She Gives Me Religion" – 4:35
 "Haunts of Ancient Peace" – 6:25
 "Full Force Gale" – 2:22
 "Beautiful Vision" – 3:34
 "Vanlose Stairway" – 5:29
 "Rave On John Donne/Rave On Part Two" – 9:09
 "Northern Muse (Solid Ground)" – 3:45
 "Cleaning Windows" – 4:56

Personnel 
Van Morrison – vocals, guitar, electric piano, alto saxophone
Pee Wee Ellis – tenor saxophone, flute, backing vocals
Mark Isham – synthesizer, trumpet
John Allair – organ
David Hayes – bass
Peter Van Hooke – drums
Tom Donlinger – drums
Chris Michie – guitar
Katie Kissoon – backing vocals
Bianca Thornton – backing vocals
Carol Kenyon – backing vocals

Charts

Notes

References
Hinton, Brian (1997). Celtic Crossroads: The Art of Van Morrison, Sanctuary, 
Heylin, Clinton (2003). Can You Feel the Silence? Van Morrison: A New Biography, Chicago Review Press,

External links
MTV: Live at the Grand Opera House Belfast
  

Albums produced by Van Morrison
Live at the Grand Opera House Belfast
Live at the Grand Opera Belfast
Mercury Records live albums
Polydor Records live albums